Jumurda Parish is an administrative unit of Madona Municipality in the Vidzeme region of Latvia. At the beginning of 2014, the population of the parish was 298. The administrative center is Jumurda village.

Towns, villages and settlements of Jumurda parish 
 Jumurda
 Vējava

See also 
 Jumurda Manor

References

External links 
 

Parishes of Latvia
Madona Municipality
Vidzeme